The Prue 215 is an American high-wing, V-tailed, single-seat glider that was designed by Irving Prue in 1949.

Design and development
The Prue 215 is an all-metal design with a short  wing with a relatively high aspect ratio of 20:1. The wing uses a NACA 23012 airfoil at the wing root, becoming a NACA 8318 at the wing tip. Airfoil-shaped flaps are mounted below and behind the wing for glidepath control. The aircraft uses a retractable monowheel landing gear.

Three Prue 215s were built, all as amateur-builts from plans. The initial one was Prue's prototype. The second one was built by Ed Minghelli and later owned by Max Dreher, who mounted a jet engine on it. The second and third built are designated 215A.

Operational history
The second Prue 215 built was flown to second place in the 1958 US Nationals by Harold Hutchinson.

Only one Prue 215 remains listed on the Federal Aviation Administration registry.

Variants
215
The first aircraft constructed was designated as a Prue 215.
215A
The second and third aircraft constructed were given the designation Prue 215A.
Brown Rebel
Prue 215 fuselage mated to wings from the Lyle Maxey Jennie Mae

Aircraft on display
National Soaring Museum - one, listed as in storage in June 2011.

Specifications (215)

See also

References

1940s United States sailplanes
Homebuilt aircraft
Aircraft first flown in 1949
V-tail aircraft